was a Japanese film producer best known as one of the two co-creators of the anime series Space Battleship Yamato. He was sometimes credited as Yoshinori Nishizaki.  He was born in 1934 and graduated from the Nihon University Art Department.

Life and work

Nishizaki graduated in 1957 from Nippon University.  His first love was music; he owned a jazz club and was also a jazz radio personality.  He formed Office Academy in 1963 as a music production company.  Nishizaki's entry into the anime world came in 1970 when he joined Osamu Tezuka's animation studio, Mushi Production, as a sales manager; his first job was to sell the studio's anime Marvelous Melmo to a TV broadcaster in Osaka.  Nishizaki produced his first anime, Triton of the Sea, in 1972, and followed it up with the ambitious musical comedy Wansa-kun in 1973; both were based on Tezuka manga, but due to an apparent copyright mixup on Nishizaki's part, Tezuka lost the rights to the anime versions of both series, and Mushi Production made both shows without Tezuka's involvement.  Both shows were also ratings disappointments.

Nishizaki produced the classic Space Battleship Yamato franchise in 1974 with its initial television run.  At first its ratings were as disappointing as those of Nishizaki's previous ventures; however, the franchise exploded in popularity in 1977 with the release of a hugely successful movie-length edit of the TV series, and "Yamato Fever" continued unabated in Japan for the next six years.  Edited versions of the three Yamato TV series were also a cult success in the United States under the title Star Blazers.

Nishizaki's other works produced during and after Yamato'''s peak of popularity did not come close to matching the explosive popularity of Yamato, and during the 1990s, he began to fall into rough straits financially.  His company, New Japan Visual Network, founded in 1984, declared bankruptcy in 1991, and Nishizaki himself declared bankruptcy in 1997 amidst his wrangling with Yamato co-creator Leiji Matsumoto over the copyrights to Yamato.  In 1994, Nishizaki designed a short-lived follow-up series called Yamato 2520, and was later sued by Matsumoto for breach of copyright.  The case over Yamato led to halting the production of the video series after only three episodes. The dispute was finally settled in 2003, with Nishizaki winning the use of the name Yamato and the original plot and characters but losing the use of the original conceptual art, ship and character designs to Matsumoto.

Nishizaki's anime film Space Battleship Yamato was released on December 12, 2009. There is also a live action film adaptation of the first TV series produced by Nishizaki which premiered in Japan during December 2010.

Legal troubles

On December 2, 1997, police stopped his car on the Tōmei Expressway in Shizuoka after he was driving suspiciously. He was arrested when police found inside his attache case 50g of stimulants, 7g of morphine, 9g of marijuana. While on bail he went to the Philippines on his English-registered cruiser the Ocean Nine; he returned to smuggle in an M16 with M203 grenade launcher, a Glock 17, and a large amount of ammunition. On January 21, 1999, Nishizaki was sentenced to two years and eight months in prison for the narcotics possession charge.

Later on February 1, 1999, he was arrested after a handgun, 131 bullets and 20 grams of stimulant drugs were seized from his house in Setagaya Ward, Tokyo.  Nishizaki, voluntarily submitted two automatic rifles, 1,800 bullets, and 30 howitzer shells kept in a station wagon in his garage, police said.  Police said that Nishizaki had hidden an Austrian handgun loaded with three bullets under a zaisu chair in a study. Nishizaki told police that he had bought the handgun in Hong Kong 10 years earlier. On February 20, 2003, he was sentenced to two years and eight months in prison for the possessing firearms charge.  He was released from prison on December 9, 2007.

Death

Nishizaki drowned on 7 November 2010 at Chichijima, Ogasawara, when he suffered an apparent heart attack  after falling off the research steamboat Yamato.

FilmographyTriton of the Sea (1972)Little Wansa (1973)Space Battleship Yamato (1974)Space Carrier Blue Noah (1979)Maeterlinck's Blue Bird: Tyltyl and Mytyl's Adventurous Journey (1980)Odin: Photon Sailer Starlight (1985)Urotsukidōji (1987)Yamato 2520 (1994)Uchū Senkan Yamato: Fukkatsu hen'' (2009)

References

External links
 
 
  An overview and review of Nishizaki's projects.
  Obituary.
 

1934 births
2010 deaths
Accidental deaths from falls
Accidental deaths in Japan
Deaths by drowning
Japanese animators
Japanese animated film producers
Manga artists
Nihon University alumni
People from Fukushima Prefecture
People from Tokyo
Space Battleship Yamato